In mathematics, specifically in elementary arithmetic and elementary algebra, given an equation between two fractions or rational expressions, one can cross-multiply to simplify the equation or determine the value of a variable.

The method is also occasionally known as the "cross your heart" method because lines resembling a heart outline can be drawn to remember which things to multiply together.

Given an equation like

 

 

In Euclidean geometry the same calculation can be achieved by considering the ratios as those of similar triangles.

Procedure 
In practice, the method of cross-multiplying means that we multiply the numerator of each (or one) side by the denominator of the other side, effectively crossing the terms over:

 

The mathematical justification for the method is from the following longer mathematical procedure. If we start with the basic equation

 

we can multiply the terms on each side by the same number, and the terms will remain equal. Therefore, if we multiply the fraction on each side by the product of the denominators of both sides——we get

 

 

and we can divide both sides of the equation by any of the elements—in this case we will use —getting

 

Another justification of cross-multiplication is as follows. Starting with the given equation

 

multiply by  = 1 on the left and by  = 1 on the right, getting

 

and so

 

Cancel the common denominator  = , leaving

 

Each step in these procedures is based on a single, fundamental property of equations. Cross-multiplication is a shortcut, an easily understandable procedure that can be taught to students.

Use 
This is a common procedure in mathematics, used to reduce fractions or calculate a value for a given variable in a fraction. If we have an equation

 

where  is a variable we are interested in solving for, we can use cross-multiplication to determine that

 

For example, suppose we want to know how far a car will travel in 7 hours, if we know that its speed is constant and that it already travelled 90 miles in the last 3 hours. Converting the word problem into ratios, we get

 

Cross-multiplying yields

 

and so

 

Note that even simple equations like

 

are solved using cross-multiplication, since the missing  term is implicitly equal to 1:

 

Any equation containing fractions or rational expressions can be simplified by multiplying both sides by the least common denominator. This step is called clearing fractions.

Rule of three 

The rule of three was a historical shorthand version for a particular form of cross-multiplication that could be taught to students by rote. It was considered the height of Colonial maths education and still figures in the French national curriculum for secondary education, and in the primary education curriculum of Spain.

For an equation of the form

 

where the variable to be evaluated is in the right-hand denominator, the rule of three states that

 

This rule was already known to Chinese mathematicians prior to the 2nd century CE, though it was not used in Europe until much later.

The rule of three gained notoriety for being particularly difficult to explain. Cocker's Arithmetick, the premier textbook in the 17th century, introduces its discussion of the rule of three with the problem "If 4 yards of cloth cost 12 shillings, what will 6 yards cost at that rate?" The rule of three gives the answer to this problem directly; whereas in modern arithmetic, we would solve it by introducing a variable  to stand for the cost of 6 yards of cloth, writing down the equation

 

and then using cross-multiplication to calculate :

 

An anonymous manuscript dated 1570 said:
"Multiplication is vexation, / Division is as bad; / The Rule of three doth puzzle me, / And Practice drives me mad."

Double rule of three 

An extension to the rule of three was the double rule of three, which involved finding an unknown value where five rather than three other values are known.

An example of such a problem might be If 6 builders can build 8 houses in 100 days, how many days would it take 10 builders to build 20 houses at the same rate?, and this can be set up as

 

which, with cross-multiplication twice, gives

 

Lewis Carroll's "The Mad Gardener's Song" includes the lines "He thought he saw a Garden-Door / That opened with a key: / He looked again, and found it was / A double Rule of Three".

See also
 Cross-ratio
 Odds ratio
 Turn (angle)

References

Further reading 
 Brian Burell: Merriam-Webster's Guide to Everyday Math: A Home and Business Reference. Merriam-Webster, 1998,  pp. 85-101
 'Dr Math', Rule of Three
 'Dr Math', Abraham Lincoln and the Rule of Three
 Pike's System of arithmetick abridged: designed to facilitate the study of the science of numbers, comprehending the most perspicuous and accurate rules, illustrated by useful examples: to which are added appropriate questions, for the examination of scholars, and a short system of book-keeping., 1827 - facsimile of the relevant section
 The Rule of Three as applied by Michael of Rhodes in the fifteenth century
 The Rule Of Three in Mother Goose
 Rudyard Kipling: You can work it out by Fractions or by simple Rule of Three, But the way of Tweedle-dum is not the way of Tweedle-dee.

External links

Fractions (mathematics)
Arithmetic